Adventures of the Little Wooden Horse is a children's novel by Ursula Moray Williams, published by George G. Harrap in 1938 with illustrations by Joyce Lankester Brisley. Early editions of the novel were illustrated by Brisley; later illustrators include Peggy Fortnum and Paul Howard. It was most recently published in 2011 by Macmillan Publishers, who also included it in the Kingfisher Modern Classics series.

Plot 

The book contains 19 chapters. The little wooden horse is a toy horse originally intended to be sold by his maker Uncle Peder. His only desire is to stay with and serve his maker but when the latter is forced out of business by the availability of cheaper mass-produced toys he becomes ill through poverty. The little wooden horse then sets out into the world to make himself a fortune for the two of them to live in peace. Through a combination of misfortune and exploitation, the little wooden horse is forced to travel a great distance and earn and lose his fortune through each of the chapters. Eventually, he does hold onto a fortune, but returning home he finds his maker has disappeared. Eventually, they are reunited through a chance and highly emotional meeting.

References

External links

 

1938 British novels
British children's novels
Sentient toys in fiction
1938 children's books
British children's books
Novels about horses
George G. Harrap and Co. books